Tramontina is a Brazilian company that manufactures cookware, cutlery and home appliances headquartered in the city of Carlos Barbosa, Rio Grande do Sul.

History
The company was founded in 1911 by Valentin Tramontina, the son of Italian immigrants from the village of Poffabro, town of Frisanco, in the Friuli region of northeast Italy. The current president is Clovis Tramontina.

Today Tramontina is one of the most important companies of southern Brazil, having ten factory plants around Brazil, eight in Rio Grande do Sul, in the cities of Carlos Barbosa, Farroupilha, and Garibaldi, one in Belém, Pará, and the other in Recife, Pernambuco.

Product lines
The company currently produces more than 22,000 items, intended for different segments.  The company has a strong presence also in the international market, exporting to over 120 countries. The organization of the plants are given as follows:

 Tramontina Belém, located in Belém, as supplementary produces wood furniture, cutting boards, wooden tool handles and utilities;
 Tramontina Cutelaria, located in Carlos Barbosa, produces knives (kitchen, professional sports), pocket knives, scissors, skewers, everyday cutlery, kitchen utensils and pots, shapes and aluminum non-stick sleepers;
 Tramontina Delta, located in Recife, produces plastic chairs, tables and toys;
 Tramontina Eletrik, also located in Carlos Barbosa, produces accessories for conduits, switches, sockets, junction boxes and aluminum accessories for electricity transmission networks;
 Tramontina Farroupilha, located in Farroupilha, produces cookware, tableware, cutlery and utensils for stainless steel kitchens;
 Tramontina Garibaldi, located in Garibaldi, produces hammers, hatchets, wrenches, screwdrivers, pliers, pincers, chisels, planes, levels, saws and handsaws;
 Tramontina Madeiras, located in Encruzilhada do Sul, produces pine panels, straight and corner shelves, bookcases and housewares;
 Tramontina Multi, also located in Carlos Barbosa, produced wheelbarrows, rakes, hoes, picks, shovels, scythes, sickles, rakes, diggers, lawn mowers, gardening and pruning shears;
 Tramontina TEEC, also located in Carlos Barbosa, produces sinks, vats, tanks, hoods, cooktops, ovens, trash cans, plant pots and accessories.

Distribution
In the domestic market, the company has six distribution centers – in Barueri, Belém, Carlos Barbosa, Goiânia, and Salvador, and four Regional Sales Offices – in Belo Horizonte, Curitiba, Porto Alegre, Recife, and Rio de Janeiro.

Stores
The company has two retail stores in Rio Grande do Sul assembled exclusively with brand products, in the city of Carlos Barbosa and another in Farroupilha.

In 2013, Tramontina opened its first concept store in the city of Rio de Janeiro, the T store. The city was chosen, according to Clovis Tramontina, president of the company, due to its hosting of international proportion such as the 2014 FIFA World Cup and the 2016 Summer Olympics.  According to him, the store will be a kind of laboratory where products will be offered first-hand to customers. In 2015 a second store in Brazil was inaugurated in Salvador, and the first outside Brazil was opened in Santiago, Chile.

International
Outside of Brazil, Tramontina has distribution and sales offices in South Africa, Germany, Australia, Chile, Uruguay, Argentina, China, Singapore, Colombia, United Arab Emirates, Ecuador, United States, Honduras, Mexico, Nigeria, Panama, Peru, Russia, United Kingdom and Trinidad and Tobago.

Employment
Tramontina has over 10,000 workers worldwide.

Sports
Tramontina also sponsors Carlos Barbosa's Futsal team Associação Carlos Barbosa de Futsal (ACBF), the largest team in Brazil.

References

External links
 

Manufacturing companies of Brazil
Companies based in Rio Grande do Sul
Manufacturing companies established in 1911
Brazilian brands
Kitchenware brands
1911 establishments in Brazil
Knife manufacturing companies